Betty Lou Mitchell (born August 14, 1937) is an American politician from Maine. A Republican, Mitchell served in the Maine Senate from 1996 to 2004, representing western Penobscot County, including her residence of Etna. Mitchell earned a diploma from Ellsworth High School in 1955.

References

1937 births
Living people
Republican Party Maine state senators
Politicians from Hartford, Connecticut
People from Ellsworth, Maine
People from Penobscot County, Maine
Women state legislators in Maine
21st-century American politicians
21st-century American women politicians